SMS Prinzess Wilhelm ("His Majesty's Ship Princess Wilhelm") was a protected cruiser of the German Imperial Navy (Kaiserliche Marine). Prinzess Wilhelm was laid down in 1886 at the Germaniawerft shipyard in Kiel, launched in September 1887, and commissioned into the fleet in November 1889. The cruiser was named after Augusta Victoria of Schleswig-Holstein, first wife of Kaiser Wilhem II.

In 1895, Prinzess Wilhelm was deployed to East Asian waters, where she frequently served as the flagship of the East Asia Cruiser Division. She was one of the three ships that participated in the seizure of Kiaochou Bay under the command of Rear Admiral Otto von Diederichs. She subsequently was present in the Philippines in the immediate aftermath of the Battle of Manila Bay between American and Spanish squadrons during the Spanish–American War in 1898. Prinzess Wilhelm returned to Germany in 1899 and was modernized in 1899–1903. She was reduced to a mine hulk in February 1914 and ultimately broken up for scrap in 1922.

Design

Her propulsion system consisted of two horizontal AG Germania 2-cylinder double-expansion steam engines that drove a pair of screw propellers. Steam was provided by four coal-fired fire-tube boilers, which were ducted into a pair of funnels. She had a crew of 28 officers and 337 enlisted men.

The ship was armed with a main battery of four 15 cm RK L/30 guns in single pedestal mounts, supplied with 400 rounds of ammunition in total. Prinzess Wilhelm also carried ten shorter-barreled 15 cm RK L/22 guns in single mounts. The gun armament was rounded out by six 3.7 cm revolver cannon, which provided close-range defense against torpedo boats. She was also equipped with three  torpedo tubes with eight torpedoes, two launchers were mounted on the deck and the third was in the bow, below the waterline. 

The conning tower had sides that were 50 mm thick.

Modifications
The ship was modernized in Wilhelmshaven in 1899; work lasted until 1902. A secondary battery of eight  SK L/35 quick-firing (QF) guns was installed in place of the L/22 guns, and six  SK L/40 QF guns were added.

Service history

Prinzess Wilhelm was the second protected cruiser built by the German navy. She was ordered under the contract name "Ersatz " and was laid down at the Germaniawerft shipyard in Kiel in 1886. She was launched on 22 September 1887, after which fitting-out work commenced. She was commissioned into the German navy on 13 November 1889.

In the first maneuvers of 1890, the newly commissioned Prinzess Wilhelm operated as the opposing force with several old corvettes. In September 1892, the ship was sent to Genoa to represent Germany in the 400th anniversary of the voyage of Christopher Columbus. She was the only German ship sent to the ceremonies, a result of cooling relations between Germany and Italy at the time. In the 1894 autumn maneuvers, Prinzess Wilhelm served as the flagship of a reconnaissance flotilla. In January 1895, Prinzess Wilhelm was dispatched to Asia to reinforce the Cruiser Division stationed there. After she joined her sister  in East Asian waters, the division was reinforced with the rebuilt old ironclad , the light cruiser , the corvette , and the gunboat . In June 1896, Alfred von Tirpitz took command of the Cruiser Division. By November, Prinzess Wilhelm was in bad need of maintenance, as engine problems limited her to half-speed.

In June 1897, Rear Admiral Otto von Diederichs arrived in Asia to take command of the Cruiser Division; Prinzess Wilhelm, Irene, and Arcona were in Chefoo conducting gunnery training. Diederichs, aboard Kaiser, joined the rest of the division in Chefoo at the end of the month. There, he held a series of ceremonial visits with the captains of each of his ships. On 1 July, Diederichs boarded Prinzess Wilhelm to make a visit to the Chinese capital at Peking. There, he attempted to negotiate with the Chinese government to acquire a permanent naval base for the Cruiser Division. Diederichs, who sought the port of Kiaochou, was unsuccessful in his attempt, and so he returned to Prinzess Wilhelm on 11 July. While leaving Peking, he examined the Taku Forts that guarded the entrance to Peking. Diederichs returned to the division on 16 July, after which he conducted a tour of Asian ports with the entire Division.

Seizure of Kiaochou
In October, Diederichs planned to rotate his ships through repair facilities in the region for periodic maintenance; Prinzess Wilhelm was scheduled to dock in Shanghai. He requested permission to take Prinzess Wilhelm and Kaiser to Kiaochou for autumn gunnery training and to leave Prinzess Wilhelm stationed there during the winter, which was denied. Diederichs was able to make use of the murder of a pair of German priests on 6 November in Shangtung, however, to justify his move against Kiaochou. At the time, the only ships available for the attack were Prinzess Wilhelm and Kaiser. Cormoran joined the two ships after a few days, and by 10 November, the ships were ready. Prinzess Wilhelm left port on the 11th, to rendezvous with Kaiser and Cormoran at sea.

On the night 12 November, the three ships met and formed into line; the attack was scheduled to begin on the morning of 14 November with a bombardment from the warships. The crews of Prinzess Wilhelm and Kaiser were to form a landing party to seize the harbor. The flotilla arrived on the morning of the 13th. The following morning, the landing party of some 700 officers and men was landed on the main pier in the harbor. The Chinese were caught completely by surprise, and the Germans secured their objectives within two hours; Diederichs convinced the Chinese commander, General Chang, to withdraw from Kiaochou. The Imperial flag was raised in the town and Prinzess Wilhelm fired a 21-gun salute. The landing party remained in Kiaochou to garrison the port, and several 3.7 cm guns were removed from the ships to provide artillery to the force.

Diederichs requested reinforcements from Germany, and the Kaiser authorized a second Division to deploy to the East Asia station. The unit was therefore reorganized as the East Asia Squadron; Prinzess Wilhelm was assigned to the I Division of the squadron. On 27 November, Diederichs was promoted to vice admiral for his success in seizing Kiaochou, and given command of the new squadron. Chinese forces converged on the port by the end of the month. Prinzess Wilhelm and Kaiser moved into the harbor to provide artillery support. General Chang, who had been placed under house arrest, was discovered to have been attempting to subvert the German occupation; Dierderichs therefore placed him under arrest aboard Prinzess Wilhelm. A brief skirmish ensued, which quickly resulted in a Chinese rout. On 8 January, a force of 50 men from Prinzess Wilhelms crew was sent to Chi-mo to defend against Chinese raids in the area.

The Philippines during the Spanish–American War
In the Spring of 1898, Prince Heinrich arrived in Asia. While awaiting his arrival, Diederichs planned to rotate his ships through dockyards for periodic maintenance. On 4 May, Diederichs made Prinzess Wilhelm his flagship and sent Kaiser to Nagasaki and followed the next day, after Prince Heinrich reached Kiaochou. The Spanish–American War had broken out on 25 April and Commodore George Dewey had defeated the Spanish squadron at the Battle of Manila Bay on 1 May. Diederichs planned to use the crisis as an opportunity to seize another base for the squadron in Asia. Upon arriving in Nagasaki, Diederichs learned the shipyard had not yet completed repairs to Kaiser, and so was unable to refit Prinzess Wilhelm for some time. He therefore ordered  to meet him in Nagasaki, which he would use as his temporary flagship. Prinzess Wilhelm and Kaiser were to rejoin Diederichs once their repairs were completed.

On 20 June, Prinzess Wilhelm arrived in the Philippines; Diederichs now had a force of five warships: Prinzess Wilhelm, Kaiser, Irene, Kaiserin Augusta, and Cormoran. After her arrival, Prinzess Wilhelm proceeded to Mariveles to replenish her coal supplies and receive new crewmen from the transport Darmstadt. On 9 August, the American squadron in the Bay ordered the neutral warships in the harbor to leave the bombardment zone, and so Prinzess Wilhelm and the other German ships went to Mariveles. Following the fall of the city, most of the German ships departed the Philippines; only Prinzess Wilhelm remained on station to protect German nationals in the islands. She was replaced by Arcona in October. In mid-November, Kaiser ran aground and had to go into drydock for repairs; Diederichs therefore made Prinzess Wilhelm his flagship. The ship remained in Asia for only a few more months, returning to European waters in 1899.

Fate
After returning to Germany in 1899, she went into drydock at the Imperial Dockyard in Wilhelmshaven for modernization; work lasted until 1902. She was stricken from the naval register on 17 February 1914 and used as a mine hulk. She was initially based in Danzig, but later moved to Kiel and Wilhelmshaven. On 26 November 1921, Prinzess Wilhelm was sold for 909,000 Marks. She was broken up the following year in Wilhelmshaven.

Footnotes

Notes

References

Further reading
 

Irene-class cruisers
1887 ships